Peter Thal Philipsen Prahm (27 July 1908 – 23 May 2003) was a Danish field hockey player who competed in the 1928 Summer Olympics. He was born in the Dutch East Indies and was the older brother of Louis Prahm.

In 1928 he was a member of the Danish team which was eliminated in the first round of the Olympic tournament after two wins and two losses.  He played all four matches as forward.

External links
 
 Peter Prahm's profile at Sports Reference.com

1908 births
2003 deaths
Danish male field hockey players
Olympic field hockey players of Denmark
Field hockey players at the 1928 Summer Olympics